Destanee Aiava was the defending champion, but lost in the second round to Jang Su-jeong.

Moyuka Uchijima won the title, defeating Olivia Gadecki in the final, 6–2, 6–2.

Seeds

Draw

Finals

Top half

Bottom half

References

Main Draw

ACT Clay Court International 1 - Singles